The Texas Governor's Cup (also known as the Cowboys–Texans rivalry, Battle of Texas, formerly the Cowboys–Oilers rivalry) is the trophy awarded to the winner of the football game between the two National Football League (NFL) teams in Texas, currently the Dallas Cowboys and the Houston Texans. Prior to the Texans' inaugural season in 2002 the Cowboys' opponent was the Houston Oilers (now Tennessee Titans). In 1991, after 13 straight games at the Cowboys' Texas Stadium, the Cowboys and Oilers went to a home-and-away format for the preseason and this format more or less continues to this day for the games between the Cowboys and Texans.

Since the first meeting between the Cowboys and Texans in 2002, the two teams have met in the regular season every fourth year and meet relatively often (by NFL standards) in the preseason; from 2002 until 2008 and again since 2013, the Cowboys and Texans have been scheduled to play each other in the preseason whenever they are not scheduled to meet in the regular season. In 2010, the teams played both a pre-season and regular season game while in 2009, 2011 and 2012 they did not meet at all. The 2017 preseason game, scheduled to be played in Houston, was cancelled due to Hurricane Harvey. In 2018, the teams played both a pre-season and regular season game once again, marking the first time that this instance of two games in one year had happened since 2010.

History

The two cities of Houston and Dallas have a rivalry that goes way back before the team's founding. Until 2010, both were the two largest cities in Texas, with Dallas being known for having wealthy elites of the Texas oil and gas industry in the early 20th century, while Houston was known for being a working-class city with the lower-tier workers working in making oil pipelines during the Texas boom. In 2010 San Antonio -- yet to ever have an NFL team -- overtook Dallas to become Texas' second largest populated city. The US Census of 2020 has Houston with 2.3 million persons, the largest populated city in Texas, followed by San Antonio with 1.5 million people, then Dallas as Texas third largest city, with 1.4 million residents.  The Houston and Dallas metropolitan areas remain far larger than San Antonio's, moreover, the Cowboys have not played in Dallas proper since .

In 1960, the NFL established the Dallas Cowboys, mainly as an effort to cut off the American Football League (AFL)'s Dallas Texans: the cutoff effort was only a partial success, as the Texans relocated to become the Kansas City Chiefs in 1963, but the AFL itself would thrive and eventually merge into the NFL in 1970.

The AFL would be the first league to place a professional team in Houston, and though the Houston Oilers and the Texans were in opposite divisions, they quickly became rivals: this culminated in the double-overtime 1962 American Football League Championship Game that the Texans won to prevent an Oilers threepeat in the Texans' last game under that identity.

In 1965, the AFL's Houston Oilers and NFL's Dallas Cowboys both drafted Oklahoma tackle Ralph Neely. The Oilers sued the Cowboys over Neely's services. In the settlement of the case, the Oilers received three Cowboys draft picks in addition to a cash settlement. The Cowboys also agreed to play five preseason games, three in Houston, against the Oilers. Thus began the Governor's Cup series, a Texas tradition created by franchise free agency.

In 1992 the Cowboys and Oilers met twice in the preseason. The first game took place in Tokyo as part of the NFL's American Bowl series, and the second meeting in Dallas for the Governor's Cup.

The 1994 Governor's Cup was not actually played in Texas but in Mexico City at Estadio Azteca as part of the American Bowl series. As a result of Estadio Azteca's unusually large seating capacity, a league record 112,246 fans watched the Oilers shut out the Cowboys, 6–0 on August 13, 1994.

The Governor's Cup went into recess after the Oilers relocated to Nashville, Tennessee at the end of the 1996 season (being rebranded as the Tennessee Titans): this left the Cowboys as the only NFL team in Texas until the Texans entered the NFL as an expansion team in 2002.

The only other professional football league to feature teams from Dallas and Houston at the same time is the 2020 incarnation of the XFL, which established the Dallas Renegades and Houston Roughnecks.

Governor's Cup win/loss to 1996
Up to the 1996 season, the Dallas Cowboys had won 18 of 31 Governor's Cup meetings leaving the Houston Oilers with 13 Governor's Cup wins.

Governor's Cup results since 2002

The Texans joined the NFL as an expansion team for the 2002 season. Since then, the series is tied overall at 9–9 as of the 2022 season. The Texans lead the pre-season series at 7–5 and the Dallas Cowboys lead the regular season series 4–2.

Game summaries

See also
Lone Star Series (MLB rivalry between Houston Astros and Texas Rangers)
Mavericks-Rockets rivalry (NBA)
Texas Derby (MLS rivalry between Houston Dynamo and FC Dallas)

Notes

References

National Football League rivalries
National Football League trophies and awards
Dallas Cowboys
Houston Texans
Houston Oilers
American football in Texas
American football in Houston
American football in the Dallas–Fort Worth metroplex
1965 establishments in Texas